Alberta is the fourth-most populous province in Canada with 4,262,635 residents as of 2021 Census of Population and is the fourth-largest in land area at . These municipalities provide local government services, including roads, water, sewer and garbage collection among others, and a variety of programs to their residents.

According to the Municipal Government Act (MGA), which was enacted in 2000, a municipality in Alberta is "a city, town, village, summer village, municipal district or specialized municipality, a town under the Parks Towns Act, or a municipality formed by special Act". The MGA also recognizes improvement districts and special areas as municipal authorities while Metis settlements are recognized as municipalities by the Government of Alberta's Ministry of Municipal Affairs. Cities, towns, villages, summer villages, municipal districts, specialized municipalities and improvement districts are formed under the provincial authority of the MGA. Special areas and Metis settlements are formed under the provincial authority of the Special Areas Act (SAA) and the Metis Settlements Act (MSA) respectively, of which both were enacted in 2000. As provincial law, the MGA, the SAA and the MSA were passed by the Legislative Assembly of Alberta with royal assent granted by the Lieutenant Governor.

Of Alberta's 344 municipalities, 257 of them are urban municipalities (19 cities, 106 towns, 81 villages and 51 summer villages), 6 are specialized municipalities, 73 are rural municipalities (63 municipal districts, 7 improvement districts and 3 special areas) and 8 are Metis settlements. The MGA, the SAA and the MSA stipulate governance of these municipalities. Alberta's Ministry of Municipal Affairs is responsible for providing provincial services to municipalities.

Over half of Alberta's population resides in its two largest cities. Improvement District No. 13 (Elk Island). Improvement District No. 12 (Jasper National Park) and Improvement District No. 25 (Willmore Wilderness) are Alberta's smallest municipalities by population; they are unpopulated according to the 2021 Census of Population.

Urban municipalities 

Alberta's Municipal Government Act (MGA), enacted in 2000, defines urban municipality as a "city, town, village or summer village." For federal census purposes, Statistics Canada recognizes all four urban municipality types as census subdivisions.

Combined, Alberta has 257 urban municipalities comprising 19 cities, 106 towns, 81 villages and 51 summer villages. These totals represent  of Alberta's population yet only  of its land area.

Cities 

Alberta has 19 cities that had a cumulative population of 3,023,641 in the 2021 Census of Population. These 19 cities include Lloydminster, of which a portion is located within the neighbouring province of Saskatchewan. Beaumont is Alberta's newest city; it became Alberta's 19th city on January 1, 2019.

Towns 

Alberta has 106 towns that had a cumulative population of 471,028 in the 2021 Census of Population. Nobleford is Alberta's newest town, which changed from a village to a town on February 28, 2021.

Villages 

Alberta has 81 villages that had a cumulative population of 32,753 in the 2021 Census of Population. The last communities to incorporate as villages were Alberta Beach and Spring Lake, which both changed from summer villages to villages on January 1, 1999.

Summer villages 

Under previous legislation, a community could incorporate as a summer village if it had "a minimum of 50 separate buildings occupied as dwellings at any time during a six-month period". A community can no longer incorporate as a summer village under the MGA.

Alberta has 51 summer villages that had a cumulative population of 5,955 in the 2021 Census of Population. The province's largest summer village by population is Norglenwold with 306, while Castle Island is Alberta's smallest summer village with a population of 15. Gull Lake and Kapasiwin were the last communities in Alberta to incorporate as summer villages. Both were incorporated on September 1, 1993. Since then, two summer villages have incorporated as villages (Alberta Beach and Edmonton Beach, now named Spring Lake) and one has dissolved (White Gull).

List of urban municipalities

Specialized municipalities 

Specialized municipalities in Alberta are unique local governments. Alberta's Municipal Government Act (MGA), enacted in 2000, provides the authority to form a specialized municipality under the following scenarios:
 where the Minister of Municipal Affairs is satisfied that the other incorporated statuses under the MGA do not meet the needs of the proposed municipality's residents;
 to form a local government that, in the opinion of the Minister of Municipal Affairs, will provide for the orderly development of the municipality in a similar fashion to the other incorporated statuses within the MGA, including other previously incorporated specialized municipalities; or
 for any other circumstances that are deemed appropriate by the Minister of Municipal Affairs.

Alberta has six specialized municipalities, which are recognized as census subdivisions by Statistics Canada. These totals represent  of Alberta's population yet  of its land area.

Lac La Biche County is Alberta's newest specialized municipality, which was formed on January 1, 2018. Alberta's first specialized municipality was the Regional Municipality of Wood Buffalo, which formed on April 1, 1995.

Strathcona County and the Regional Municipality (RM) of Wood Buffalo are home to the unincorporated hamlets of Sherwood Park and Fort McMurray respectively. These communities are designated urban service areas, which are deemed equivalents of cities. Excluding Sherwood Park and Fort McMurray, 18 other unincorporated communities, also recognized as hamlets by Alberta Municipal Affairs, are distributed among Mackenzie County, Strathcona County and the RM of Wood Buffalo.

Rural municipalities 

Rural municipalities in Alberta include municipal districts, improvement districts and special areas. For federal census purposes, Statistics Canada recognizes all three rural municipality types as census subdivisions. However, Statistics Canada embeds Alberta's eight Metis settlements, a separate type of municipality, into the census subdivisions for six municipal districts.

Combined, Alberta has 73 rural municipalities comprising 63 municipal districts, 7 improvement districts and 3 special areas. These totals represent  of Alberta's population yet  of its land area.

Municipal districts 

In Alberta, a municipal district, typically branded as a county, is a type of rural municipality.

Alberta has 63 municipal districts that had a cumulative population of 470,620 in the 2021 Census of Population. Unincorporated communities recognized as hamlets by Alberta Municipal Affairs are located within every municipal district with the exception of Mountain View County, the MD of Ranchland No. 66 and the MD of Spirit River No. 133.

Improvement districts 
In Alberta, an improvement district is a type of rural municipality that can be incorporated by the Lieutenant Governor in Council on the recommendation of Alberta's Minister of Municipal Affairs under the authority of the MGA. Improvement districts are administered by the Province of Alberta through its Ministry of Municipal Affairs.

Alberta had eight improvement districts that had a cumulative population of 2,024 in the 2021 Census of Population. The number of improvement districts was reduced to seven on May 1, 2021 when Improvement District (ID) No. 349 dissolved by way of annexation to the MD of Bonnyville No. 87. Five of Alberta's improvement districts are within national parks while two are within provincial parks. Alberta Municipal Affairs recognizes two unincorporated communities within improvement districts as hamlets – Lake Louise within ID No. 9 (Banff National Park) and Waterton Park within ID No. 4 (Waterton Lakes National Park).

Special areas 

In Alberta, a special area is a type of rural municipality that can be incorporated by the Lieutenant Governor in Council under the authority of the Special Areas Act, which was enacted in 2000. They were originally created in 1938 as a result of hardship brought upon a particular area in southeastern Alberta during the drought of the 1930s.

Alberta has three special areas that had a cumulative population of 4,238 in the 2021 Census of Populations. The province's largest by population and land area is Special Area (SA) No. 2 with 1,860 and  respectively. The last special area to form was SA No. 4, which incorporated on January 1, 1969 through the removal of certain lands from SA No. 3. The three special areas are administered as a single unit by the Special Areas Board, and are home to 16 unincorporated communities recognized as hamlets by Alberta Municipal Affairs.

List of rural municipalities

Metis settlements 

Metis settlements are unique local governments dedicated to Alberta's Metis people. The settlements were originally created in 1938 under the authority of the Metis Population Betterment Act with land and governance being transferred to the settlements in 1989. Metis settlements are presently under the jurisdiction of the Metis Settlements Act, which was enacted in 2000.

Alberta has eight Metis settlements. Unlike the other types of municipalities, Metis settlements are not recognized as census subdivisions by Statistics Canada for federal census purposes. Rather, Statistics Canada recognizes them as designated places embedded within six municipal districts.

Alberta's eight Metis settlements had a cumulative population of 4,238 in the 2021 Census of Population.

See also 

List of former urban municipalities in Alberta
List of population centres in Alberta

Notes

References

External links 
 Alberta Municipal Affairs
 Alberta Municipalities
 Association of Summer Villages of Alberta
 Metis Settlements General Council
 Rural Municipalities of Alberta

Municipalities